The Quell House is a historic house at 222 South Wright Street in Siloam Springs, Arkansas.  It is a -story Craftsman bungalow with a shallow-pitch side gable roof, and a front gabled porch extending across the front which is supported by stuccoed piers.  The gables have deep eaves and exposed rafter ends.  The walls are finished in stucco that had a gravel-like material thrown against it while wet, giving it a rough and textured surface.  Built c. 1920, it is a fine local example of the Craftsman/bungalow style.

The house was listed on the National Register of Historic Places in 1988.

See also
National Register of Historic Places listings in Benton County, Arkansas

References

Houses on the National Register of Historic Places in Arkansas
Houses completed in 1920
Houses in Siloam Springs, Arkansas
National Register of Historic Places in Benton County, Arkansas